Nagari may refer to:

Writing systems
 Nāgarī script, a script used in India during the first millennium 
 Devanagari, a script used since the late first millennium and currently in widespread use for the languages of northern India
 Nandinagari, a script used in southern India from the late first millennium until the 19th century 
 Sylheti Nagari, a script used in the Sylhet area of Bangladesh and nearby parts of India

Places
 Nagari, Andhra Pradesh, a town in India
 Nagari (Assembly constituency)
 Nagari, Rajasthan, a village in India

Other uses
 Nagari (surname)
 Nagari (settlement), an administrative unit in parts of Sumatra, Indonesia
Bolwell Nagari, a sports car produced in Australia by Bolwell
 Nagari, a clan of the Gujjar / Gurjar ethnic group

See also
 Nagar (disambiguation)
 Nagri (disambiguation)
 Nigari, Japanese term for the magnesium chloride used in tofu-making